Copernican federalism is an analogy for federalism. It is named for Renaissance astronomer Nicolaus Copernicus.

Analogy
Various authors and theorists have evoked Copernican heliocentrism to describe tiers of government. Here an analogy is made between the hierarchical organization of the Solar System and governments within a nation. There are various approaches.

The most common approach describes the Sun as analogous to a federal government and the states and other administrative divisions as planets. Thomas Jefferson wrote that the U.S. states were "like the planets revolving round their common sun, acting and acted upon according to their respective weights and distances,"  Alexander Hamilton invoked a similar analogy in Federalist No. 9, using the word "orbit." Jefferson used the analogy to emphasize the systematic, self-balancing nature of the new United States Constitution. The analogy is also employed in an attempt to borrow Copernican simplicity as compared to Ptolemaic complexity. The implication here is that federal structures are more practicable than having many-to-many relationships.

Some theorists have used the analogy in the context of improving international relations, for example Emery Reves in The Anatomy of Peace: "Our political and social conceptions are Ptolemaic. The world in which we live is Copernican."

Civil service reform
In 2000, the Belgian federal government commenced a program of civil service reform, called the “Copernicus Plan.” The object of the plan is for citizens to no longer revolve around the civil service, but for the civil service to revolve around the citizens.

See also
 Copernican paradigm

Federalism